Tazana Mikkel Kamanga-Dyrbak (born 12 January 2002) is a Danish sprinter.

Kamanga-Dyrbak attended Millfield School for a time. He has a Zambian mother, and a Danish father who grew up in Kenya, both former international swimmers. He lives and trains in Kenya where he has set up a sprint club and trains with his Kenyan coach.

International competitions

Personal bests
Outdoor
100 metres – 10.22 (+1.5 m/s, Sestriere 2022)
200 metres – 20.48 (+0.3 m/s, Lusaka 2021), NR
4 × 100 metres relay – 38.16 (Tokyo 2021) NR

References

External links
 

2002 births
Living people
Danish male sprinters
Danish people of Zambian descent
Athletes (track and field) at the 2018 Summer Youth Olympics
Athletes (track and field) at the 2020 Summer Olympics
Olympic athletes of Denmark
People educated at Millfield